"Graveyard Shift" is a short story by Stephen King, first published in the October 1970 issue of Cavalier magazine and collected in King's 1978 collection Night Shift. It was adapted into a 1990 film of the same name.

Setting
Graveyard Shift is set in a small town in Maine, and the action largely takes place in a textile mill.

Plot summary
A young drifter named Hall has been working at a decrepit textile mill in a small town in Maine when the cruel foreman, Warwick, recruits him and others to assist with a massive cleaning effort. The basement of the old mill has been abandoned for decades, and over the years, a monumental infestation of rats has taken hold. 

This rat empire, cut off from the rest of nature, has allowed the animals to evolve into a strange and varied combination of creatures; complete with its own bizarre, self-sustaining ecosystem. There are large, armored rats, albino, weasel-like rats that can climb up walls or burrow through the ground; and bat-like rats that have evolved to pterosaurian sizes. The men eventually come across a sub-basement, locked from the inside. Warwick then enlists Hall to go down and investigate the sub-basement and that he may take whomever he likes. Hall chooses Warwick who, despite trying to prevent them from entering, is forced to press on. 

As they make their way through the sub-basement, Hall and Warwick discover that it harbors something more terrifying and hideous than any of them could have dreamed—a cow-sized queen rat with no eyes or legs, whose only purpose is to endlessly breed more rats. Hall sprays Warwick towards the queen with a hose they were using to attack the rats. As the queen devours Warwick, Hall makes his way towards the exit while spraying the rats. However, he is overwhelmed and eaten alive by the hordes of mutated rats. Meanwhile, the other team of workers on the surface wonders what has happened to them and, with no idea what kind of horror awaits them, prepares to descend into the basement.

See also
Stephen King short fiction bibliography

References

External links

Graveyard Shift by Stephen King

1970 short stories
Horror short stories
Short stories adapted into films
Mice and rats in literature
Short stories by Stephen King
Works originally published in Cavalier (magazine)
Maine in fiction